The union territory of Dadra and Nagar Haveli and Daman and Diu has currently only one-functional airport at Diu. There's another airport at Daman but it is not-operational. Daman Airport is proposed to be operationalised soon under the centre's UDAN scheme. Dadra and Nagar Haveli district does not have an airport of its own yet.

List
The list includes the airports in Dadra and Nagar Haveli and Daman and Diu with their respective ICAO and IATA codes.

References

Dadra and Nagar Haveli and Daman and Diu
 
Buildings and structures in Dadra and Nagar Haveli and Daman and Diu